Henry Havelock Pierce (May 7, 1864 - November 20, 1943), also known as H. H. Pierce, was a noted American portrait photographer once celebrated for his society portraits.

Pierce was born in Margaretsville, Nova Scotia, Canada. After his family moved to Cambridge, Massachusetts, at the age of 17 he apprenticed at William Notman's Harvard studio, then worked at Boston's McCormick & Heald gallery located at 22 Winter Street. In September 1886 he became manager of the Heald studio in Providence, Rhode Island, where he opened his own studio a few years later. Later he had studios in Boston, Manchester-by-the-Sea, and New York City, but in addition travelled extensively to make his portraits.

Pierce was an innovator in portrait lighting, using both direct sunlight and stand-alone lights, screens, and reflectors to disperse lighting and bring out subtle shadows. In 1900 he served as president of the Photographic Club of New England, and in 1904 was the only American photographer to receive a medal at the Royal Photographic Society's London exhibition. 

Pierce's portraits range from Calvin Coolidge and Alice Roosevelt Longworth to John Singer Sargent and Henry Clay Frick.

Books 
 At Home Portraits, by Henry Havelock Pierce, 1905

References 
 "Henry Havelock Pierce, An Appreciation," by Sadakichi Hartmann, The Photographic Journal of America, vol. LII, no. 4. H-2b, April, 1915. 
 "In Diplomacy's Town", by Sidney Allen with photographs by Henry Havelock Pierce, Metropolitan Magazine, Volume 23, 1905, pages 737-744. 
 Birth place and date, death date
 Historic Camera article
 Photo-Era, Vols. III-IV, Boston: The Photo Era Publishing Company, 1900, pp. 476-482.
 The New Photo-Miniature, Vol. VI, London: Dawbarn & Ward, 1904, p. 409.
 The American Amateur Photographer, Vol. XVIII, New York: The American Publishing Co., 1906, p. 256.
 The Photographic Journal of America, Vol. LII, New York: Edward L. Wilson Company, Inc., 1915, pp. 181-189.
 The Valiant Knights of Daguerre, Berkeley: University of California Press, 1978, pp. 210-214.

External links

1864 births
1943 deaths
19th-century American photographers
20th-century American photographers
Photographers from Massachusetts